Wommelgem is a municipality located in the Belgian province of Antwerp. The municipality only comprises the town of Wommelgem proper. In 2021, Wommelgem had a total population of 12,991. The total area is 13.01 km².

Economy

Wommelgem is one of 25 municipalities within the Albert Canal economic network (Economisch Netwerk Albertkanaal).

The hardware store-chain Hubo Belgium is headquartered in Wommelgem.

References

External links
 
  Official website

Municipalities of Antwerp Province
Populated places in Antwerp Province